The 1963–64 Challenge Cup was the 63rd staging of rugby league's oldest knockout competition, the Challenge Cup.

First round

Second round

Quarter-finals

Semi-finals

+ Abandoned after 12 minutes of extra time due to bad light.

Final
Widnes beat Hull Kingston Rovers 13-5 in the Challenge Cup played at Wembley Stadium on 9 May before a crowd of 84,488.

This was Widnes’ third Challenge Cup final win in five Final appearances. Frank Collier, their prop forward, was awarded the Lance Todd Trophy for his man-of-the-match performance.

References

Challenge Cup
Challenge Cup